Georgios Stephanou (1824–1901) was a Greek gendarmerie officer and revolutionary. He was one of the leaders of the Greek revolt in Epirus in 1878.

Biography

Stephanou was born in 1824 in Qeparo, Himara, Ottoman Empire, in modern southern Albania. He joined the Greek gendarmerie in 1849. In 1877, in an effort to take advantage of the ongoing Russo-Turkish War, he received orders from Greek government to discuss with the Albanian beys of the regions of Kurvelesh and Himara, a combined armed uprising in Epirus and Albania, both regions being under Ottoman rule that time. However the new cabinet of Alexandros Koumoundouros rejected the possibility of an alliance with Albanians and preferred the idea of a Greek revolution in Ottoman Epirus.

In 1878, as a gendarmerie major he was appointed as one of the leaders of an anti-Ottoman revolt in Epirus, leading a group of 700 Greek Epirotes. His troops landed in the coastal region of Sarandë on February 11, 1878. They took control of the coastal strip opposite Corfu and the surrounding in the region of Delvinë, as well as the coastal settlement of Saranda. The revolt initially spread to the adjacent regions. However, a numerically superior Ottoman force of 6,000 arrived, supported by Ottoman-Albanian irregulars, and suppressed the uprising. Stephanou escaped to Souli and from there returned to Greece.

He reached the rank of colonel. He died at 1901.

References

Sources

1824 births
1901 deaths
Hellenic Gendarmerie officers
Greek colonels
People from Himara